Marjory LeBreton  (born July 4, 1940) is a Canadian former leader of the Government in the Senate of Canada, a cabinet-rank position; and past national chair of Mothers Against Drunk Driving in Canada. She worked with four leaders of the Progressive Conservative Party of Canada - John Diefenbaker, Robert Stanfield, Joe Clark and Brian Mulroney - from 1962 to 1993 before being appointed to the Senate on the advice of Mulroney.  She sat as a Progressive Conservative Senator from her appointment until moving with most of her caucus colleagues to the new Conservative Party of Canada in 2004, of which she was soon elected to Chief Whip.  She served as an advisor to then opposition leader Stephen Harper during the 2006 election, which the Conservative Party won.  After the election, she was named to the cabinet position Leader of the Government in the Senate. On July 4, 2013, LeBreton announced she would not continue in the position as of the next cabinet shuffle, which occurred later that summer. She retired from the Senate upon reaching her 75th birthday on July 4, 2015.

Early and personal life 
Marjory LeBreton was born in and completed her elementary and secondary school education in the neighbourhood of City View, in the city of Nepean, Ontario which is today part of Ottawa.  She is married to Douglas LeBreton, with whom she had two children: Linda and Michael.  Linda was killed in an accident involving a drunk driver which led to LeBreton's active involvement in the Mothers Against Drunk Driving organization.

Progressive Conservative staffer 
LeBreton began working at Progressive Conservative party headquarters in 1962, moving from there to the office of leader John Diefenbaker when he became opposition leader following the 1963 election.  During her time in the leader's office, she accompanied him on a national whistlestop tour during the 1965 election.

Following Diefenbaker's resignation as leader, she continued in the leader's office under Robert Stanfield through his three election campaigns - 1968, 1972 and 1974.  When Stanfield announced his resignation in 1975, she went to work in the PC Party office helping to coordinate the 1976 Progressive Conservative leadership convention. Joe Clark won the 1976 convention and hired LeBreton  as his office's tour coordinator, a position she held until Clark won the 1979 federal election.

LeBreton later worked in the office of Brian Mulroney while he was prime minister, rising to position of Deputy Chief of Staff and Government Appointments Director.  She was appointed by Mulroney to the Senate on June 18, 1993, shortly before his retirement from politics.

Senator 
LeBreton is generally considered to be a Red Tory and is progressive on social issues such as abortion rights. She was also one of the few politicians in the Parliament of Canada to oppose Bill C-36, Canada's anti-terrorism legislation in 2001.

She was a long-time foe of proposals to merge the Progressive Conservatives with the Canadian Alliance but reluctantly supported the late 2003 proposal to unite the parties and subsequently became a Conservative Party of Canada senator once the merger was completed. Over time, she warmed to the new party, and later served as one of Stephen Harper's top advisors in the 2006 federal election.

Senator LeBreton was appointed Leader of the Government in the Senate by Prime Minister Stephen Harper In February 2006 and also acquired the role of Secretary of State for Seniors during a cabinet shuffle on January 4, 2007. On July 4, 2013, she announced her resignation from the cabinet after a stormy period of expenses scandals that tarnished the reputation of the Conservatives, but remained a Conservative Senator for Ontario. As the scandals intensified, LeBreton gave a defiant speech to the Senate in which she said Ottawa was "populated by Liberal elites and their media lickspittles". LeBreton was well known for her campaign work where her job was to "assist the media."

Committee assignments 
Following her appointment to the Senate, during the 34th Canadian Parliament, she sat on the Standing Committee on Internal Economy, Budgets and Administration.

During the 35th Parliament, she sat on the Internal Economy committee, Standing Committee on Social Affairs, Science and Technology, Standing Committee on Agriculture and Forestry, as well as the Special Committee on Pearson Airport Agreements.

In the 36th Parliament, she sat on the Internal Economy committee, Social Affairs committee, Agriculture and Forestry committee, Standing Committee on Transport and Communications, Standing Committee on Banking, Trade and Commerce, as well as the Special Committee on Security and Intelligence.

In the 37th Parliament, she sat on the Social Affairs committee, the Agriculture and Forestry committee, the Transport and Communications committee, the Standing Committee on Privileges, Standing Rules and Orders, and the Standing Committee on National Finance.

In the 38th Parliament, she sat on the Social Affairs committee, the Transport and Communications committee, the Standing Committee on Rules, Procedures and the Rights of Parliament, the Standing Committee on Human Rights, and the Standing Committee on Foreign Affairs.

In the 39th Parliament, she sat on the Social Affairs committee, the Rules committee, the Human Rights committee and the Foreign Affairs committee.

During the 37th, 38th and 39th parliaments, she was vice-chair of the Social Affairs committee.  During the 40th Parliament, as government leader, she did not sit formally on any committee, but was an ex-officio member of them all.

See also 
 List of Ontario senators

References

External links 
Marjory LeBreton's Biography

1940 births
Members of the King's Privy Council for Canada
Canadian senators from Ontario
Conservative Party of Canada senators
Living people
Women members of the Senate of Canada
Women in Ontario politics
Members of the 28th Canadian Ministry
Women government ministers of Canada
21st-century Canadian women politicians